Colin Campbell Rosoman Witney (11 January 1920 – 1 September 2009) was an Australian rules footballer who played with Footscray in the Victorian Football League (VFL).

Notes

External links 

1920 births
2009 deaths
Australian rules footballers from Victoria (Australia)
Western Bulldogs players